EUN may refer to:

Eun, Korean surname, Korean given name
Eunos MRT station (station abbreviation)
Hassan I Airport (IATA code)
Unified Team at the Olympics
Unified Team at the Paralympics